The 2000 Waterford Senior Hurling Championship was the 100th staging of the Waterford Senior Hurling Championship since its establishment by the Waterford County Board in 1897. The draw for the opening round fixtures took place on 14 February 2000. The championship began on 23 April 2000 and ended on 10 September 2000.

Ballygunner were the defending champions.

On 3 September 2000, Mount Sion won the championship after a 1-20 to 0-09 defeat of Ballygunner in the final at Walsh Park.  It was their 31st championship title overall and their first title since 1998.

Stradbally's Trevor Curran was the championship's top scorer with 1-38.

Team changes

To Championship

Promoted from the Waterford Intermediate Hurling Championship
 Shamrocks

From Championship

Relegated to the Waterford Intermediate Hurling Championship
 Fourmilewater

Format change

At a meeting of the Waterford County Board on 14 February 2000, the proposal to restructure the championship format was voted on and overwhelmingly accepted by delegates. Chairman Paddy Joe Ryan's proposal to end the participation of group teams in the championship after a three-year trial period was also accepted. The new format allowed for the participation of 12 club teams. The four semi-finalists of the previous year were to be seeded so as not to meet in the opening round of six games. The six losing first round teams would be divided into two groups of three to play a round-robin series with the winning team in each group going forward to join the six first-round winners in an open draw for the quarter-finals.

Results

First round

Losers' group

Group A

Group A table

Group A results

Group B

Group B table

Group B results

Group B play-off

Relegation play-offs

Quarter-finals

Semi-finals

Final

Championship statistics

Top scorers

Overall

In a single game

References

Waterford
Waterford Senior Hurling Championship